Morning is the fifth studio album and the first English language album from the Hong Kong English pop/Cantopop singer Janice Vidal, released on 3 July 2009 under the record label Amusic.

Track listing
 Morning – 4:09
 Please – 3:30
 Speechless – 4:06
 Rainbows – 4:20
 Make My Day – 2:58
 999 – 3:28
 Remember – 2:59
 TV – 4:08
 Pretty – 3:49
 Every Morning – 3:20

The title of track 6 refers to the emergency telephone number 999, which is used in Hong Kong and the United Kingdom. The lyrics read "Who should I call now? If you want to live on, call 999, let them do the things you gonna be fine!". Track 5,  Make My Day, makes extensive use of Auto-Tune effects. The last track, Every Morning is the acoustic guitar version of the first track Morning.

See also
Hong Kong English pop

External links
 Entry on the Amusic official website

References

Janice Vidal albums
2009 albums